Kenneth A. Paulson (born 1953) is the director of the Free Speech Center at Middle Tennessee State University, former dean of MTSU's College of Media and Entertainment, and former editor-in-chief of USA Today.

Paulson is the founder and director of the "1 for All" campaign for the First Amendment He formerly hosted "The Songwriters," a television show MTSU created in partnership with the Nashville Songwriters Hall of Fame.

Paulson edited Gannett Company newspapers in Wisconsin, New York, New Jersey, and Florida, which led to a personal connection with Gannett president Al Neuharth, founder of the Freedom Forum. Paulson later led the Freedom Forum's First Amendment Center and its Newseum.

He earned a bachelor's degree in journalism from the University of Missouri and a Juris Doctor degree from the University of Illinois College of Law.

In 2018 Paulson testified before the United States House Committee on Education and Labor about how First Amendment rights were expressed on college campuses, saying he didn't "believe there’s an epidemic of suppression or intolerance in the nation’s universities." Instead, he said, most students were concerned about “paying for school, staying in school and making good enough grades to get a job when they leave.”

References

External links

Ken Paulson Biography at The Free Speech Center
C-SPAN Q&A Interview with Paulson, August 28, 2005

Living people
USA Today journalists
University of Missouri alumni
Middle Tennessee State University faculty
1953 births